Navarretia squarrosa (skunkbush, skunkweed, or California stinkweed) is a spreading annual plant from North America which is noted for its skunk-like odour. It grows to between 10 and 60 cm in height and has tubular lilac pink to deep blue flowers up to 12 mm in diameter in dense terminal heads, encircled by spiny sepals and bracts. The leaves are pinnately lobed and spiny.

Occurrence
The species is native to British Columbia, Washington, Oregon,  and California, and is naturalised elsewhere, including Australia and New Zealand.
It is commonly found at elevations of less than 800 metres on open, wet, gravelly flats and slopes.

Specific plant associations where N. squarrosa occurs include the specialized Monterey Cypress forests near Carmel, California.

References

squarrosa
Flora of British Columbia
Flora of California
Flora of Oregon
Flora of Washington (state)
Natural history of the California chaparral and woodlands
Natural history of the California Coast Ranges
Natural history of the San Francisco Bay Area
Plants described in 1826
Flora without expected TNC conservation status